Molde Fotballklubb is a professional football club based in Molde, Norway, that competes in Eliteserien, the top flight of Norwegian football. Founded on 19 June 1911, the club was originally known as International and changed its name to Molde in 1915. Molde are five-time league champions (2011, 2012, 2014, 2019 & 2022) and five-time Norwegian Cup winners (1994, 2005, 2013, 2014 and 2022), and have finished second in the league a further nine times. Molde is one of only two Norwegian clubs to have participated in the UEFA Champions League.

The club's home matches are played at the 11,249-capacity Aker Stadion. The stadium was inaugurated in 1998, and was a gift from local businessmen Kjell Inge Røkke and Bjørn Rune Gjelsten. The club was formerly based at Molde stadion, which hosted the club's record attendance of 14,615. Molde's supporter club is called Tornekrattet ("Thicket of thorns", a reference to the city's nickname "The Town of Roses") and was founded after the 1994 Norwegian Cup final victory. Molde has its strongest rivalry with Rosenborg.

Until the beginning of the 1970s, the club mainly played in local lower division leagues, except for a short visit in the Hovedserien in the 1957–58 season. In 1974, Molde was back in the top division and finished second in the league, and have since then become one of Norway's leading clubs and generally stayed in the top division. Molde also finished second in the league in 1987, when the club lost the championship to Moss in the decisive match of the season.

During the 1990s and the beginning of the 2000s, Molde was the second-best team in Norway (behind 13-times in a row champions Rosenborg), with league silver medals in 1995, 1998, 1999 and 2002, and cup championships in 1994 and 2005, as well as participation in the UEFA Champions League in the 1999–2000 season, when Real Madrid, Porto and Olympiacos visited Molde.

As of 2017, the club has approximately 1,000 members and around 55 teams in three departments. Erling Moe has been manager of the club since the departure of Ole Gunnar Solskjær in December 2018; he has been permanent head coach since 29 April 2019.

History

Early years (1911–63)
Molde FK was founded on 19 June 1911 by a group gathered by Klaus Daae Andersen (born 30 September 1873); they named J. Ferdinand Dahl as the inaugural chairman. On a general election on 24 April 1912, it was decided that the club would be named International, perhaps because the opponents were primarily visitors from cruise ships or trading vessels, or that it was to make room for the many Danes who worked in the Gideon engine factory. The same year, on 5 August, the club played its first competitive match, an away match against Kristiansund which ended 2–2. The rising interest and activity in football in neighbouring towns caused the club to change its name to Molde Fotballklubb in 1915. The club played its first season in the top division in 1939–40, but the season was abandoned due to the German occupation and was never completed. In the first post-war season in 1947–48, Molde were relegated from the top flight.

The breakthrough (1964–77)
On 2 August 1964, Molde shocked nine-time Norwegian Cup champions and nine-time Norwegian League Champions Fredrikstad by eliminating them from the 1964 Norwegian Cup in the third round with a 3–2 win at home. Jan Fuglset, Torkild Brakstad and Harry Hestad, amongst others, played at Molde during that period. The club played in local lower leagues, save for a short visit in the top division in the 1957–58 season. In 1970, Molde was promoted to the second tier and played there for three seasons until its promotion to the top flight with a 5–1 away win against Sogndal on 16 September 1973.

In 1974, Molde returned to the premier division following the debut of several talented players in the first team, which coincided with the return of top level players like Fuglset, Brakstad and Hestad. Molde surprised the established clubs in their first season of the 1. divisjon, leading the league in 9 of 22 matchdays. Ahead of the final match of the season, Molde would win the league if they defeated Sarpsborg and Viking lost against Strømsgodset. However, both Molde and Viking won their last match, meaning Molde won the silver medal after finishing one point behind champions Viking.

Since then, Molde has generally stayed in the top division and has become one of Norway's leading clubs. The club has produced a respectable number of national team players, and players who have gone professional in foreign leagues.

Ups and downs (1978–93)
Between 1978 and 1984, Molde did not play on the same level in two consecutive years. Molde was relegated from the 1. divisjon in every even-numbered year, and promoted to back to the first tier in every odd-numbered year, making it three consecutive promotions and relegations. In fact, Molde and Brann did not play at the same level these years, as Brann were promoted when Molde was relegated and the other way around.

In 1982, Molde played in their first cup final, despite being relegated from the 1982 1. divisjon. They lost the final at Ullevaal Stadion 3–2 against Brann.

The 1987 season was the closest Molde came to winning the league championship before winning it in 2011, when a draw at home against Moss in the final round would have ensured the title. Despite numerous goal scoring opportunities, Moss won the match 2–0 at Molde stadium, thus winning the league championship, while Molde won their second silver medal. The attendance of 14,615 set the record at the old Molde stadion.

Molde played their second cup final in 1989. The first match against Viking ended in a 2–2 draw, and the subsequent replay was won 2–1 by Viking.

When Molde again was relegated from the Norwegian top flight in 1993, the club was in major economic difficulties following a number of projects, the most notably of which was an extension of the main stand at Molde stadion.

The silver generation (1994–2000)
Åge Hareide was the main coach of Molde in 1994, when they finished second in their 1. divisjon group and was thus re-promoted to Tippeligaen. Molde also met their main rivals Rosenborg in the semi-final of the 1994 Norwegian Cup, and with 4–3 win on aggregate, Molde qualified for their third cup final. After having lost to Molde, Rosenborg head coach Nils Arne Eggen called Molde's playing style "arse-football" ("rævvafotball"). Molde won their first title by defeating Lyn 3–2 at Ullevaal Stadium in Oslo.

During the 1995 season, Molde became known for their three strikers: Ole Gunnar Solskjær, Arild Stavrum and Ole Bjørn Sundgot. In their first league match, Molde won 6–0 against Brann in Bergen, with Solskjær scoring two goals and Stavrum and Sundgot also contributing in one of Brann's heaviest-ever losses at home. With six-straight wins, Molde stayed in the top two positions of the league throughout the season, but eventually finished second, 15 points behind Rosenborg.

Solskjær scored 31 goals in 42 matches for Molde and was sold to Manchester United on 29 July 1996 as Molde finished in eighth position that season. In 1997, Molde finished fourth in the league, and Erik Brakstad replaced Åge Hareide as head coach ahead of the 1998 season.

In 1998, Molde played their first 21 matches without losing, a Norwegian record until 2009, when Rosenborg went 26 matches undefeated. In the 22nd round, Molde lost against Vålerenga while Rosenborg defeated Kongsvinger to surpass Molde at the top of the table. Rosenborg player Mini Jakobsen subsequently said, "It was fun as long as you managed to keep up. Thank you for helping to create tension in the Premier League!" On 26 September 1998, Rosenborg won 2–0 against Molde in the 23rd round and won the championship, with Molde settling for second place.

In 1999, Molde had a successful season, finishing second in the league and reaching the semi-final of the 1999 Norwegian Cup, where they were eliminated by Brann. Molde also participated in the UEFA Champions League, where Molde was drawn against CSKA Moscow in the second qualifying round. In the first match in Moscow, Molde lost 2–0, while in the second leg, 19-year-old Magne Hoseth had his big break-through with two goals when CSKA was defeated 4–0 to send Molde to the third qualifying round, where they met Mallorca. The first leg against Mallorca ended 0–0 at home. Away at Mallorca were Molde one goal behind for a long time, but Andreas Lund became the big hero when he equalized on a penaltyin the 84th minute. With a 1–1 aggregate score, Molde qualified for the group stage on away goals, and Molde became the team from the smallest city to have qualified for the group stage of Champions League until Unirea Urziceni repeated the feat in 2009–10. In the group stage, Molde were drawn against Real Madrid, Porto and Olympiacos, and with one win and five losses, Molde finished last in their group. On the occasion of Molde's 100-year anniversary in 2011, the readers of the local newspaper Romsdals Budstikke voted 1999 as the best year in the history of the club.

From "Gunder method" to relegation (2001–2006)
On 6 November 2000, after the sacking of Erik Brakstad, Gunder Bengtsson was announced head coach for two years. After one season, Bengtsson and his assistant Kalle Björklund were signed for three more years. In 2002, Gunder Bengtsson led Molde to second place in the league, but like when he won the league with Vålerenga in 1983 and 1984, there was not much enthusiasm around the club's sixth silver medal because of the defensive tactics and lack of local players in the squad.

In the first six matches of the 2003 season, Molde collected five points. On 22 May 2003, Bengtsson was fired and replaced by Odd Berg. In the third round of 2003 Norwegian Cup, Molde were eliminated by second-tier club Skeid. Despite the change in the coaching staff, Molde was struggling in the relegation zone throughout the season, but after a 3–2 win away against Sogndal in the last match of the season, Molde avoided the relegation playoffs. In 2004, the team led by Reidar Vågnes, former assistant coach under Erik Brakstad, but Molde only managed 11th place, four points clear of relegation.

In 2005, Bo Johansson became head coach of Molde, and on 15 June 2005, Molde won 3–2 against Nybergsund to qualify for the fourth round of the Norwegian Cup, having lost in the third round for three consecutive years. Molde finished 12th in the league and had to play in the relegation playoff against Moss, which Molde won 5–2 on aggregate. Molde won their second Norwegian Cup title on 6 November 2005 when they won 4–2 after extra time against Lillestrøm in the final. Bo Johansson left Molde after only one season with the club, and on Christmas Eve, Arild Stavrum was announced as the new head coach.

Following the Norwegian Cup champions, Molde played in the 2006–07 UEFA Cup. On 25 August 2006, they were drawn to face Scottish giants Rangers in the first round. They were eliminated 2–0 on aggregate after holding Rangers to a 0–0 draw at the Aker Stadion. The same year, Molde was relegated, having been in the relegation zone for the last four seasons. The relegation became final after losing 8–0 against Stabæk at Nadderud in the second-last match of the season. Arild Stavrum was fired at the end of the season.

A new era (2007–present)
In December 2006, Kjell Jonevret became head coach after Stavrum was fired, though Ove Christensen was the club's first choice. With Jonevret as coach, Molde won the 2007 1. divisjon and was again promoted back to the top flight. After the promotion to Tippeligaen, Molde recorded a 5–1 win against Vålerenga on the last day of Moldejazz 2008, as well as eliminating Brann from the cup with an impressive 8–0 win at home four days later. Regardless of these strong results, Molde finished ninth in their comeback season in the top flight.

In the 2009 season, Molde was again the second-best team in Norway, behind champions Rosenborg, who that season overtook Molde's 1998 unbeaten streak record. Conversely, Molde ruined Rosenborg's march for a possible double with a 5–0 win at Aker Stadion in the quarter-final of the 2009 Norwegian Cup. In the final, Molde met their local rivals Aalesunds FK, where Aalesund won the Norwegian Championship on penalty shoot-out after the score ended 2–2 after extra time. After collecting only 20 points during the first 22 matches in the 2010 Tippeligaen, Jonevret was sacked and replaced by Uwe Rösler. Under Röslers management, Molde collected 20 points in the last eight matches and avoided relegation. Despite the poor performance by the team, Baye Djiby Fall, who spent the season on loan from Lokomotiv Moscow, became the first Molde player since Jan Fuglset in 1976 to be the top goalscorer in Eliteserien.

Prior to the club's 100-year anniversary in 2011, former Molde and Manchester United player Ole Gunnar Solskjær returned to Molde to manage the club. In the opening match of 2011 Tippeligaen, his first competitive match, Molde lost 3–0 away against newly promoted Sarpsborg 08. On 19 June 2011, Molde celebrated their anniversary with a 2–0 win against Sogndal and positioned themselves at the top of the league table. Molde was leading the league until they eventually won their first championship on 30 October 2011, when Rosenborg, the only team that could mathematically have still beaten them to first place with two matches remaining, lost 6–3 at home to Brann. Molde successfully defended their title in 2012 by beating Hønefoss 1–0 on 11 November, with one match remaining in the season. Although Molde could only finish sixth behind champions Strømgodset in the 2013 Tippeligaen, they defeated Rosenborg 4–2 in the 2013 Norwegian Cup final on 24 November to win the Norwegian Cup for the third time in their history. Ole Gunnar Solskjær left the club to sign for Premier League side Cardiff City on 2 January 2014.

Under new manager Tor Ole Skullerud, Molde won their first domestic league and cup double in 2014, however Skullerud was fired in August 2015 due to a run of mediocre results and Solskjær (whose run at Cardiff lasted just nine months) was brought back to the team. On 19 December 2018 Solskjær left the club to join Manchester United as caretaker manager, with club director Øystein Neerland stating that Solskjær left on a loan deal for the remainder of the season. However, Solskjær was signed permanently by Manchester United in March 2019 and Molde's caretaker manager Erling Moe got the manager job on a permanent basis on 29 April. Moe led Molde to their fourth league title in his first full season in charge.

Kit
Molde's club colours are blue shirts, white shorts and white socks, which has become the standard Molde FK home kit. Molde's traditional away colours are the same as for the home kit, but in the opposite order; white shirts, blue shorts and blue socks. All-blue home kits and all-white away kits has been common for Molde to use in European games.

Molde's first shirt sponsor, Opel, agreed for the 1980 season. Following that, several short-term deals was made before a long-term deal was signed with G-Sport in 1992. In 1999, Molde ended their contract with G-Sport and were sponsored by Commit for three seasons. Sparebanken Møre became their shirt sponsor in 2003, a deal first renewed in 2007 worth NOK 20 million over a five-year period. In 2016, the club once again renewed their sponsorship with the savings bank, signing a deal until 2019. In February 2020, Molde and Sparebanken Møre announced that they had agreed to a deal until the end of the 2022 season.

For twelve years in the beginning of the 21st century, from 2002 to the end of 2013, Molde's shirts were supplied by Umbro. In December 2013, Molde signed a four-year deal with Nike starting January 2014.

Kit suppliers and shirt sponsors

Stadiums 

Molde's current stadium is the Aker Stadion, formerly known as Molde Stadion, located at Reknes, by the seashore of central Molde. The  cost was mostly paid for by investor Kjell Inge Røkke, after whom the ground has been nicknamed "Røkkeløkka". The official name of the new stadium was Molde Stadion until 3 May 2006, when the stadium name changed to Aker Stadion following a sponsorship deal with Røkke's company Aker. The stadium was inaugurated on 18 April 1998, when the stadium was officially opened by Prime Minister and Molde fan Kjell Magne Bondevik. In the opening match, Molde defeated Lillestrøm 4–0 in their first home match of the season, attracting 13,010 spectators. Tommy Berntsen scored the first goal on Aker Stadion with an own goal, while Daniel Berg Hestad was the first Molde player to score a goal at the new stadium. The all-time attendance record was set on 26 September when Molde hosted Rosenborg in front of 13,308 people. When Molde qualified for the 1999–2000 UEFA Champions League group stage, the stadium was converted to an all-seater, with seats being installed on the lower sections of the short end stands. This reduced the attendance capacity permanently because the club chose not to remove the seats afterwards. Today the capacity of Aker Stadion is 11,249.

Before moving to Aker Stadion in the beginning of the 1998 season, Molde had been playing their home matches at Molde Idrettspark (at the time called Molde stadion), a municipal-owned multi-use venue, since 1955. Molde Idrettspark was inaugurated on 28 August 1955, when Kristiansund was defeated 1–0. About 2,500 spectators attended the inaugural match. The first top-tier league match was played here on 28 July 1957, when Molde managed a 1–1 draw against Sandefjord in the first round of 1957–58 Norwegian Main League. When Molde earned a promotion to the 1974 1. divisjon, the main stand was expanded. The unsurpassed record attendance at Molde Idrettspark is 14,615 in a match against Moss in 1987. Today, Molde Idrettspark is used by Træff and Molde 2.

Support
Molde's supporter club is Tornekrattet (English: "The thicket of thorns"). The name Tornekrattet is a reference to the city's nickname "Rosenes by" (English: "The Town of Roses") and was founded after the 1994 Norwegian Football Cup Final victory.

Rivalries

Molde has their strongest rivalry with Rosenborg. Other rivals are Møre og Romsdal neighbours Aalesund and Kristiansund.

The rivalry with Rosenborg arises from the numerous times the two teams have battled for the Eliteserien title. With 29 titles between them, this fixture has become known as one of the finest Eliteserien match-ups.

Players

Current squad 

For season transfers, see 2022 Molde FK season.

Out on loan

Reserves

Former players 

Erling haaland

Player records

All current players are in bold

Most matches played 
The following is a list of the ten Molde players with the most appearances in the top division.
Last updated: 7 August 2022

Most goals scored
The following is a list of the twelve Molde players who have scored the most top division goals.
Last updated: 10 August 2022

Player of the season

Club officials

Club directors

Coaching staff

Medical and sport science staff

Honours 

Molde are one of the most successful clubs in Norway in terms of trophies won. The club's first trophy was the Norwegian Cup, which it won in 1994. In 2011, the club won its first league title, and won its first double in 2014.

Domestic

League
First tier
Eliteserien
Champions (5): 2011, 2012, 2014, 2019, 2022
Runners-up (11): 1974, 1987, 1995, 1998, 1999, 2002, 2009, 2017, 2018, 2020, 2021
Third (3): 1977, 1988, 1990
Second tier
1. divisjon
Winners (3): 1937–38, 1938–39, 1948–49
Landsdelsserien (Møre)
Winners (3): 1953–54, 1955–56, 1956–57
2. divisjon/1. divisjon 
Winners (3): 1973, 1983, 2007 
Third tier
3. divisjon (Møre)
Winners (2): 1969, 1970

Cup 
Norwegian Cup:
Winners (5): 1994, 2005, 2013, 2014, 2021–22
Runners-up (3): 1982, 1989, 2009

Doubles 
League and Cup: 2014

Non-official 

La Manga Cup:
Winners (1): 2010

Records 

Source:

European history

The following is a list of the all-time statistics from Molde's games in the three UEFA tournaments the club has participated in, as well as the overall total. The list contains the tournament, the number of games played (Pld), won (W), drawn (D) and lost (L). The number of goals scored (GF), goals against (GA), goal difference (GD) and the percentage of matches won (Win%). The statistics include qualification matches and is up to date as of the match against Gent on 3 November 2022.

Recent history

List of Molde managers

 Arne Legernes (player-manager) and Gunnar Talsethagen (1956–1957)
 Charlie Pohl (1958)
 Gunnar Talsethagen (1959–1961)
 Ulf Møller (1962)
 Gunnar Talsethagen (1963–1968)
 Harry Hestad and Torkild Brakstad (both player-managers) (1969)
 Torkild Brakstad (player-manager) (1970–71)
 Harry Hestad and Torkild Brakstad (both player-managers) (1972)
 Jan Fuglset (player-manager) (1973)
 Joseph Hooley (7 January 1974 – 19 May 1974)
 Torkild Brakstad, Jan Fuglset and Harry Hestad (all player-managers) (1974)
 Jack Johnsen (1975)
 Torkild Brakstad and Jan Fuglset (both player-managers) (1976)
 Huib Ruygrook (1 March 1977 – 1979)
 Torkild Brakstad (4 January 1980 – 31 December 1981)
 Jan Fuglset (player-manager) (11 January 1982 – 21 July 1984)
 Joseph Hooley (22 July 1984 – 31 December 1984)
 Hans Backe (7 January 1985 – 31 December 1985)
 Åge Hareide and Harry Hestad (4 January 1986 – 31 December 1989)
 Åge Hareide (5 January 1990 – 18 August 1991)
 Ulrich Møller (caretaking player-manager) (18 August 1991 – 31 December 1991)
 Jan Fuglset and Ulrich Møller (player-manager) (1 January 1992 – 31 December 1993)
 Åge Hareide (1 January 1994 – 31 December 1997)
 Erik Brakstad (1 January 1998 – 31 October 2000)
 Gunder Bengtsson (1 January 2001 – 22 May 2003)
 Odd Berg (caretaker) (22 May 2003 – 31 December 2003)
 Reidar Vågnes (1 January 2004 – 5 March 2005)
 Bo Johansson (18 March 2005 – 31 December 2005)
 Arild Stavrum (1 January 2006 – 8 November 2006)
 Kjell Jonevret (1 January 2007 – 30 August 2010)
 Uwe Rösler (interim) (31 August 2010 – 31 December 2010)
 Ole Gunnar Solskjær (10 January 2011 – 2 January 2014)
 Tor Ole Skullerud (13 January 2014 – 6 August 2015)
 Erling Moe (caretaker) (7 August 2015 – 21 October 2015)
 Ole Gunnar Solskjær (21 October 2015 – 18 December 2018)
 Erling Moe (19 December 2018 – Present)

History of league positions (since 1963) 

Molde played in the top tier and appeared among the championship contestants in 1947–48 and 1957–58, but the league was differently organized at the top levels until 1963.

Footnotes

References

External links 

Molde F.K.
MFKWeb – Frequently updated independent supporter site
Tornekrattet supporter club – formerly official, now independent

 
Association football clubs established in 1911
1911 establishments in Norway
Football clubs in Norway
Eliteserien clubs
Sport in Molde